"Peace" (stylized in all lowercase) is a song by American singer-songwriter Taylor Swift. It was written by Swift and its producer Aaron Dessner, and is the fifteenth track on her eighth studio album, Folklore, which was released on July 24, 2020, through Republic Records. Swift has named "Peace" her most personal song on the album.

Set to a slow minimal composition of a soft piano and harmonized guitars over a ticking electric pulse, "Peace" is a lo-fi song that combines elements of R&B, funk and jazz. Its lyricism sees Swift pledge her commitment to her lover while discussing the negative impact of her superstardom on their private life. She warns him of all the troubles one has to face when with her, and questions him whether it would be adequate if she could never give him the normalcy they strive to attain in her highly publicized life.

Reviews praised "Peace" for its emotional lyrics, Swift's elastic vocal performance, and stripped instrumentation. Several music critics named it one of the best songs Swift has ever written, picked it as the album's most autobiographical song, and noted traces of the vulnerable themes from Swift's sixth studio album, Reputation (2017), in the song. Upon Folklore release, "Peace" charted in Australia (number 33), Canada (46), and the United States (number 58). It reached number 12 on the Billboard Hot Rock & Alternative Songs chart.

Background and release 
Taylor Swift conceived Folklore as a set of mythopoeic visuals in her mind, a result of her imagination "running wild" while isolating herself during the COVID-19 pandemic.

Swift penned "Peace" upon hearing an instrumental track composed by Aaron Dessner. She felt an "immediate sense of serenity" that provided the tranquil feeling of at being peaceful, however, she thought it would be "too on-the-nose" to sing about finding peace; Swift hence wrote about complex "conflicted" feelings in contrast to the calming sound of the track. She recorded it in one vocal take. On July 23, 2020, Swift announced her eighth studio album, Folklore, and revealed its track listing where "Peace" placed fifteenth. The album was released on July 24, 2020.

Composition and lyrics 

Characterized by a sparse, lo-fi instrumentation, "Peace" is a minimal R&B-influenced song with a slow funk bassline, consisting of three lushly harmonized electric guitars juxtaposed over a ticking pulse, further textured by subtle synthesizers and a drizzle of soft piano notes. Swift employs her soulful jazzy vocals in the "Peace", via a complex vocal melody, ranging between F3 to A4. The song is written in the key of F major and has a moderately fast tempo of 150 beats per minute.

The song structure of "Peace" is an ode reminiscent of a prayer. Its lyrics discuss the effects of Swift's hectic superstardom on her private life, and is directly addressed to her lover, warning them of the challenges that come with them being a part of her hyper-publicized life. The song's title is deceptive, since "Peace" is about failing to achieve peace, seeing Swift confess that "tranquility is the only thing she can't promise" her lover. After witnessing the dissection and blemish of her personal life by the press for over a decade, especially tabloid media, Swift has been tight-lipped and private about her boyfriend since 2016, English actor Joe Alwyn, who co-wrote and co-produced select tracks on Folklore. "Peace" channels the balance Swift struck between her private and public lives, more rooted in her personal life unlike the fictional majority of Folklore.

Notable details in the song's lyrics include Swift's mention of Alwyn's younger brother in the lyric "Family that I chose now that I see your brother as my brother", the second time she mentions him in her discography, after the track "Paper Rings" from her 2019 album Lover. An Insider critic opined that the lyric "But there's robbers to the east / clowns to the West" is a mention of her famous feuds, underscoring "the spectacle of Swift's everyday and her inability to escape the trappings of public life"; "robbers" referring to Scott Borchetta and Scooter Braun, the former of whom sold own the masters of Swift's first six albums to the latter, while the "clowns to the West" refers to Kanye West and his ex-wife Kim Kardashian.

Critical reception 
Sarah Carson of i remarked "Peace" as "the most romantic song" Swift has ever written, containing the "storybook poetry hallmarks" of her early country career, and underlined the lyric "All these people think love's for show / But I would die for you in secret." Variety critic Chris Wilman called "Peace" the "champion romance song", and along with fellow track "Invisible String", found it a suitable addition that contrasts the overaching sadness of Folklore. He thought "Peace" is a "realistic" love ballad that "renders all the compensatory vows of fidelity and courage all the more credible and deeply lovely". The Guardian Laura Snapes complimented the "deep dedication" Swift expresses in "Peace".

Writing for Vulture, Nate Jones felt that "Peace" is "more clearly autobiographical than much of the album", having Swift apologize to her lover for "the stress that comes with dating one of the world's most famous women". He added that the song's purpose can come off as "an insufferable flex", but "her unassuming authenticity keeps it far away from humblebrag territory". Callie Ahlgrim of Insider said the song has Swift promise to give her partner "passion and warmth and undying loyalty" but yet "wrestles with her inability to promise peace". Also writing for Insider, Courteney Larocca admired the song's "gut-wrenchingly vulnerable" lyrics, "stunning" musical composition, and Swift's "crisp" vocal performance. She also drew lyrical parallels between "Peace" and Swift's older songs "Call It What You Want" (2017) and "The Archer" (2019).

WRVU stated that "Peace" is one of the "most exquisite" songs Swift has ever written, representing a love song in "the absolute purest and most devoted sense", with some of the "lushest" lyrics she has ever written. The review praised the "improvisational" song structure of "Peace", deviating from standard pop structures of "a regular verse-chorus-bridge", and pinpointed that the song's central theme is a derivative of Swift's sixth studio album, Reputation. In a mixed commentary, Kathryn Flynn of Consequence felt the song's slow pace and muted R&B sound does not fit the overall texture of Folklore.

Commercial performance 
Upon Folklore release, all of the album's tracks debuted on both the US Billboard Hot Rock & Alternative Songs and the all-genre Hot 100 charts; "Peace" entered at number 12 on the former, and at number 58 on the latter. It further reached number 33 on Australia's ARIA Singles Chart and number 46 on the Canadian Hot 100.

Credits and personnel
Credits adapted from the album's liner notes and Pitchfork

 Taylor Swift – vocals, songwriter
 Aaron Dessner – producer, songwriter, recording engineer, bass, piano, synthesizer, field recording, Mellotron and drone
 Justin Vernon – Pulse
 Laura Sisk – recording engineer
 Jonathan Low – mixing, recording engineer
 Randy Merrill – mastering engineer

Charts

Weekly charts

Year-end charts

References

2020 songs
Taylor Swift songs
Songs written by Taylor Swift
Songs written by Aaron Dessner
Song recordings produced by Aaron Dessner